Whitchurch is a parish and a small hamlet lying on the left bank of the River Stour in Warwickshire, England, some four miles south-south-east of the town of Stratford-upon-Avon.

Hamlet
The population at the 2011 census was 174. Consisting today of just five properties with a total population (in 2007) of 19, it occupies the site of an earlier, larger village which was depopulated in the 15th and 16th centuries as the result of land clearance schemes carried out by the then lords of the manor. A Norman church survives, now standing alone in the middle of fields, and the medieval village's fish ponds are still visible today when the river floods.

Parish
From 1997 to 2001, the British children's television series Teletubbies created for the BBC was filmed at a farm in Wimpstone. Until 1931, the parish of Whitchurch – which includes the larger settlements of Wimpstone and Crimscote – formed (together with the parishes of Ilmington and Stretton-on-Fosse) a detached part of Warwickshire, separated from the rest of the county by an exclave of Worcestershire. John Marius Wilson's Imperial Gazetteer of England and Wales described the parish in 1870-72 thus:

See also
List of county exclaves in England and Wales 1844–1974

References 

Villages in Warwickshire
Civil parishes in Warwickshire
Stratford-on-Avon District